Southern Cross Subglacial Highlands is a group of subglacial highlands located east of Webb Subglacial Trench in the north end of Wilkes Subglacial Basin. The feature was delineated by the Scott Polar Research Institute (SPRI)-National Science Foundation (NSF)-Technical University of Denmark (TUD) airborne radio echo sounding program, 1967–79, and was named after the Southern Cross, the expedition ship of British Antarctic Expedition, 1898–1900, led by Carsten Borchgrevink.

Plateaus of Antarctica
Landforms of George V Land
Highlands